Coelogyne trinervis is a species of orchid. It is native from Indo-China to west and central Malesia.

Images

References

External links 

trinervis